NBC station(s) may refer to:

 Television stations affiliated with the NBC TV network in the United States:
 List of NBC television affiliates (by U.S. state)
 List of NBC television affiliates (table)
 NBC Owned Television Stations, the group of NBC's owned and operated stations
 NBC PNG in Papua New Guinea
 Namibian Broadcasting Corporation in Namibia
 Nation Broadcasting Corporation in the Philippines
 Newfoundland Broadcasting Company in Canada, now CJON-DT
 Norwegian Broadcasting Corporation in Norway

See also
 NBC (disambiguation)